Clonmore is a village and townland in County Tipperary, Ireland. It lies on the R433 road 6 km from Templemore and 7 km from Errill in County Laois. It is part of the parish of Templemore, Clonmore and Killea. The local Roman Catholic church is dedicated to Saint Ann and was built in 1832.

The Gaelic Athletic Association club is J.K. Bracken's GAC.

See also
 List of towns and villages in Ireland

References

External links
 Clonmore Settlement Plan
 Clonmore National School
 St Ann's Church Graveyard

Towns and villages in County Tipperary
Townlands of County Tipperary